Mischelbach is a district of Pleinfeld in Bavaria, in the governmental district Central Franconia and administrative district Weißenburg-Gunzenhausen. The village has about 400 inhabitants.

External links
 Homepage from Mischelbach

Villages in Bavaria
Weißenburg-Gunzenhausen